Elizabeth Hawthorne  (born 30 April 1947) is a New Zealand actress who is known for her role as Mrs. Macready in the 2005 film The Chronicles of Narnia: The Lion, the Witch and the Wardrobe and the Peter Jackson supernatural comedy The Frighteners. She had a small recurring role as the voice of Hera on Young Hercules, and partly played Alcmene in its parent show Hercules: The Legendary Journeys in the first season. She played Judge Harriet Caldwell in the 2004 TV movie Raising Waylon. Married to Raymond Hawthorne, she is the mother of Emmeline Hawthorne and the late Sophia Hawthorne.

Filmography

Film

Television

Honours and awards
Hawthorne was appointed an Officer of the New Zealand Order of Merit, for services to the theatre, in the 2001 Queen's Birthday Honours.

References

External links

1947 births
Living people
New Zealand television actresses
New Zealand film actresses
New Zealand soap opera actresses
Officers of the New Zealand Order of Merit
20th-century New Zealand actresses
21st-century New Zealand actresses